Uresha Ravihari Wickremasinghe, (born 26 June 1982; as උරේෂා රවිහාරී [Sinhala]), is a Sri Lankan songstress. Considered one of the leading female playback singers in Sri Lankan Sinhala cinema, Ravihari has won numerous awards at local film and television festivals including Sarasaviya Awards for Best Vocalist in three consecutive years.

Personal life
She was born on 26 June 1982 in Nugegoda. Her father Dharmasri Wickremasinghe is a renowned announcer at Sri Lanka Broadcasting Corporation (SLBC). Her mother is Chandra Wickremasinghe. Ravihari has one brother, Navod who is two years younger. She completed education from Samudradevi Balika Vidyalaya, Nugegoda and then at St. Paul's Girls School, Milagiriya. She was also clever at music as well as dancing.

She is married to Ruchira Nadeera, who is a doctor at Panadura Hospital. Wedding was celebrated in January 2012 at Galle Face Hotel. The couple has one son, Sasen Pravivek.

Career
Her career begins at very little age where she used to listen music classes conducted by veteran singer Dr.Sujatha Attanayake at a neighbor house. Then she started to learn music and vocal train by attending to her classes. At the age of 8, she made her maiden playback singing with the film Shakthiya Obai Amme with her teacher Dr.Sujatha Attanayake and Tony Hassan.

At the age of 9, she released her first album, titled Surathal Nangiye. She continued perform many occasion with both Sinhala and Hindi songs and released Hindi- Sinhala mix CD/cassette at the age of 13 as her second album. She got the opportunity to sing Hindi songs in a musical program telecast on ITN on every Tuesday. Her third album, Kasun Tharaka was released when she was 16 years old.

At the age of 13, Ravihari made her debut acting in the film Malsara Doni produced by her father. In the film, her song Unna Eka Gangavaka became highly popularized. However she selected music industry as her pathway and completed 'Prathama' and the Diploma in Hindustani music under Sujatha Attanayaka and late Austin Munasinghe. She also completed 'Bharatha Natyam' under Preethi Ganegoda and Vasuki Shanmugampilla.

In 1996, Ravihari won the award for the best selling CD/cassette at Rasa Awards Festival for her album Sithin Man Aaderai. Then in 1998 she won the award for the best singer at Sumathi Awards for the song in the television serial Sasala Ruwa. In 2005, she won the best singer award at Raigam Tele'es for the song in serial Idorayaka Mal Pipila.

Apart from music and dancing, Ravihari completed a diploma in beauty culture under Suwineetha Kotalawala. In 2006, she won the Best singer award at both Signis OCIC Award Festival and Presidential Film Festival for the film Anjalika.

Awards
 Best selling CD/cassette at Rasa Awards Festival 1996 - album Sithin Man Aaderai
 Best Vocalist at Sumathi Awards 1998 - television serial Sonduru Wasanthe
 Best Vocalist at Raigam Tele'es 2005 - television serial Idorayaka Mal Pipila
 Best Vocalist at Signis OCIC Award Festival 2006 - film Anjalika
 Best Vocalist at Presidential Film Festival 2006 - film Anjalika
 Best Vocalist at Sarasaviya Awards 2007 - film Rosa Kale
 Best Vocalist at Sarasaviya Awards 2008 - film 	Asai Man Piyabanna
 Best Vocalist at Derana Film Festival 2015 - film WarigaPojja
 Best Vocalist at Hiru Golden Film Festival 2018 - film Sarigama

Playback singing

Playback film tracks

References

External links
 Uresha Ravihari songs
 පුතාට දැන් මාස දහයක්‌ - උරේෂා
 Uresha Ravihari sings sensitive song for a former LTTE member
 No any competition with Nirosha
 නිරෝ­ෂාගේ විවා­හය ගැන කතා කරන්න කැමැති නෑ
 ඒ සුන්දර අත්දැකීම් මාත් දැන් විදිනවා - Uresha Ravihari
 රැල්ලට යන්නෑ - Chat with Uresha Ravihari

Living people
21st-century Sri Lankan women singers
Sinhalese singers
1982 births
20th-century Sri Lankan women singers